Milicent Patrick (born Mildred Elizabeth Fulvia di Rossi, after marriage Milicent Trent; 11 November 1915 – 24 February 1998) was an American actress, makeup artist, special effects designer and animator. Born in El Paso, Texas, Patrick spent much of her early life in California, most notably in San Simeon, as her father, Camille Charles Rossi, was superintendent of construction at Hearst Castle. In 1939 Patrick began working for Walt Disney Studios and during her time there became one of the studio's first female animators. Patrick continued her career at Universal Studios and is cited as being the first woman to work in a special effects and makeup department. She is best known for being the creator of the head costume for the iconic Gill-man from the film Creature from the Black Lagoon.

Early life
Mildred Elizabeth Fulvia di Rossi was born on November 11, 1915, in El Paso, Texas, the second of three children. Her father, Camille Charles Rossi, was superintendent of construction at Hearst Castle, working under Julia Morgan, the first licensed female architect in the state of California. The family moved from San Francisco to San Simeon, California when Patrick was six. During her childhood Patrick grew close with William Hearst's wife, Millicent Hearst, who would become the model for Patrick's later name change. In 1932 Julia Morgan and Camille Rossi's contentious working relationship caused Morgan to appeal to Hearst that Rossi be removed from the project, uprooting the Rossi family from the grounds at Hearst Castle. The Rossi family then moved to Glendale, California and in 1933 Mildred started attending Glendale Junior College, but left in 1935 without graduating. She went on to study at Chouniard Art Institute for three years, where she focused on illustration and drawing, receiving three scholarships based on her talent.

Career 
Mildred Rossi began working at Walt Disney Studios in 1939 in their all-female ink and paint department. By 1940, she was moved to the Animation and Effects department, where she became one of the first female animators at Disney. Her work as a color animator can be seen in four of the sequences in the film Fantasia.  She also created the animated creature, Chernabog, featured in the last sequence of the film, "Night on Bald Mountain". During her time at Disney, she also worked on the film Dumbo before leaving the studio in 1941.

After leaving Disney, she began modeling in trade shows and as a promotional model. In 1947, while waiting outside a hotel, she met agent William Hawks, who began representing her and obtaining small acting roles in studio productions.

Milicent Patrick began working behind the scenes when she met Bud Westmore, head of the Universal Studios makeup department, during an acting job when she showed him her sketches. She became the first woman to work in a special effects makeup department and is credited with contributing to the pirate faces in Against All Flags, the makeup of Jack Palance in Sign of the Pagan, part of the design of the It Came From Outer Space Globs, Mr. Hyde in Abbott and Costello Meet Dr. Jekyll and Mr. Hyde, the Metaluna mutant in This Island Earth, and was a mask maker for The Mole People.

In 1953, Patrick designed the Gill-man creature for the film The Creature from the Black Lagoon. During promotion for the film Patrick was sent on a press tour, dubbed "The Beauty Who Created the Beast", to discuss the creation of the creature. This was quickly changed by Westmore to "The Beauty Who Lives With the Beast", to avoid citing Patrick as the creator of the Gill-man. When she returned to Los Angeles from the press tour Patrick was informed that she no longer worked for Universal Studios, having been let go due to Westmore's jealousy over Patrick being associated with the creation of the Gill-man.

After leaving Universal, Patrick never worked behind the scenes again and returned to small acting roles. The creation of the Gill-man was credited to Westmore, until recent research, most notably by Mallory O'Meara in her 2019 book The Lady From the Black Lagoon, revealed Patrick to be the designer. Earlier, in the 1970s, Forrest J. Ackerman did an eight-page article documenting Patrick's Black Lagoon creation and her work on other monster films in Famous Monsters Magazine; Ackerman knew Patrick and wished to give her proper credit. Her Gill-man work was also explored in a 2011 Tor.com article by Vincent Di Fate.

Personal life 
Mildred Rossi met her first husband, Paul Fitzpatrick, while working at Walt Disney Studios. Fitzpatrick was married, and they began an affair that was discovered by Fitzpatrick's wife, who later died by suicide when Fitzpatrick refused to stop seeing Rossi. They married in 1945, resulting in Mildred's estrangement from her family, and a name change to Mil Fitzpatrick. When they divorced she changed her name again to Mil Patrick.

In 1948, Patrick changed her name again to her most recognized name, Milicent Patrick. Patrick then had a relationship with voice actor Frank L. Graham in 1950. Several weeks after she ended their relationship, Graham killed himself at his home.

She married again to Syd Beaumont, who died of cancer in 1954.

In 1955, Patrick met Lee Trent, the voice actor for the first three and a half years of the Lone Ranger radio program. After a tumultuous relationship marked by canceled engagements, Patrick married Trent in a Las Vegas chapel wedding in December 1963. They filed for divorce in January 1969, but continued to have an on-off relationship for years.[2]

Patrick developed Parkinson's disease in 1988 and later breast cancer. She died on February 24, 1998, at a hospice care center in Roseville, California.

Filmography

Film
 The World in His Arms - Lena (uncredited)
 The Women of Pitcairn Island - Island Woman
 He Laughed Last - Eagle's Secretary (uncredited)
 Lust for Life - Julie (uncredited)
 Man Without a Star - Boxcar Alice (uncredited)
 Abbott and Costello Meet Captain Kidd - Tavern Wench (uncredited)
 We're Not Married! - Governor's Secretary (uncredited)
 Scarlet Angel - Dolly (uncredited)
 Mara Maru - Extra (uncredited)
 Westward the Women - Flashy Woman (uncredited)
 Thunder in the Pines - The Lady In Black (uncredited)
 Bride of Vengeance - (Uncredited)
 Varieties on Parade - Ticket girl (uncredited)
 A Song Is Born - Woman at Dorsey Club (uncredited)
 Texas, Brooklyn and Heaven - Water Nymph (uncredited)

Television
 Lawman S2E26 "The Surface of Truth" - Mary Beyer
 Westinghouse Desilu Playhouse - Senora Alvarez
 The Restless Gun "Hornitas Town" - Rosita
 It's a Great Life "Call Michigan 4099" & "Three Hungry Men" - Waitress & Salegirl
 Ramar of the Jungle "Tribal Feud", "White Savages" & "Evil Trek" - The White Goddess
 The Roy Rogers Show "Ride of the Ranchers" - Elena

References

Further reading 
  A biography.

1915 births
1998 deaths
20th-century American actresses
American film actresses
American television actresses
Animators from Texas
American people of Italian descent
American make-up artists
Walt Disney Animation Studios people